Lechon kawali, also known as lechon de carajay or litsong kawali in Tagalog, is a Filipino recipe consisting of pork belly slabs deep-fried in a pan or wok (kawali). It is seasoned beforehand, cooked then served in cubes. It is usually accompanied with a dipping sauce such as sarsa ng litson (lechon sauce) made from vinegar and pork liver or toyomansi (soy sauce with calamansi).

When deep-fried extensively until golden brown and crispy, it becomes the Ilocano bagnet, a variant of chicharon. Lechon kawali is also a common accompaniment or ingredient to stir-fried water spinach with shrimp paste (binagoongang kangkong).

See also
Bagnet
Lechon

References

Philippine pork dishes